Hookerian is an eponymous adjective and may refer to:

Joseph Dalton Hooker (1817–1911), British botanist and explorer
Richard Hooker (1554–1600), Anglican priest and influential theologian